The Ujh river (or Ujjh river) is a tributary of the Ravi River that flows through the Kathua district in the Indian union territory of Jammu and Kashmir.

Course 

Four streams, Bhini, Sutar, Dunarki and Talan join Ujh at Panjtirthi. Ujh and Bhini are perennial rivers. The rest are seasonal.

At Karandi Khurd, the Ujh river spins off a 'western branch', which joins back with the main branch near Gharotta in Pakistani Punjab. Even though it is but a small stream, the western branch achieved notability as Cyril Radcliffe defined the India–Pakistan border to follow the course of this branch until reaching the trijunction of the Shakargarh, Pathankot and Gurdaspur tehsils. From the trijunction, the border was to follow the tehsil boundaries.

Water utilisation 
The water of Ujh river is used for drinking, irrigation and to feed a number of small canals and khuls of the district. It is also used to transport timber from hills to the plains and provides construction materials such as sand and stones.

Ujh Barrage has been constructed on this river at Jasrota village. A new Ujh dam is proposed  higher up the course of the river as it passes through the outer hills. The dam is projected to store 925 million cubic metres of water and generate 196 MW of electricity.

References

External links
 Ujh River marked on OpenStreetMap: 1, 2, 3, 4

Rivers of Jammu and Kashmir
Kathua district
Rivers of India